The 2019–20 C.F. Monterrey season was the 84th season in the football club's history and the 69th consecutive season in the top flight of Mexican football.

Coaching staff

Players

Squad information

Players and squad numbers last updated on 22 July 2019.Note: Flags indicate national team as has been defined under FIFA eligibility rules. Players may hold more than one non-FIFA nationality.

Transfers

In

Out

Competitions

Overview

Torneo Apertura

League table

Results summary

Result round by round

Matches

Liguilla

Quarter-finals

Semi-finals

Finals

Copa MX

Group stage

Matches

FIFA Club World Cup

Statistics

Squad statistics

Goals

Hat Tricks

Clean sheets

Disciplinary record

References

External links

Mexican football clubs 2019–20 season
C.F. Monterrey seasons
Monterrey